Aline Cristine Dorelli de Magalhães e Morais (born 22 December 1982), known professionally as Alinne Moraes, is a Brazilian actress. She is best known by her roles as Maria Sílvia in Duas Caras and as Luciana in  Viver a Vida.

Biography and career
Moraes was born in Sorocaba, São Paulo. She is an atheist. Before becoming an actress, she worked as a fashion model, starting at the age of 12 and retiring 6 years later. As a popular actress in Brazil, she was named as one of 100 Sexiest Women in the World 2004 (or As 100 Mulheres Mais Sexy do Mundo 2004 by VIP magazine internet poll. Besides appearing in VIP magazine, she has also appeared in magazines such as Claudia, Nova, UMA, Marie Claire, Trip, Boa Forma and Elle Brasil.

In 2014, Moraes was cast in Em Família but was unable to make it to filming due to her pregnancy, she was later replaced by Tainá Müller.

Her first work as an actress was on the telenovela Coração de Estudante, where she played a young unmarried mother. In 2003, in Mulheres Apaixonadas she played Clara, a gay teenager. In 2004, she starred in the telenovela Da Cor do Pecado, she co-starred as Moa, a brain tumor patient. Between 2004 and 2005 she played her first lead role in Como uma Onda as Nina, a woman whose affections are sought after by two men: her boyfriend, Jorge Junqueira, and Daniel Cascaes, a Portuguese man. In 2006 she starred in the film Fica Comigo Esta Noite which is an adaptation of a Flávio de Souza's play. In the telenovela Bang Bang, she played the role of Penny Lane, a scholar of advanced physics.

Between 2007 and 2008, Moraes played one of her most remarkable characters: the villain psychopath Maria Silvia, in the Rede Globo's primetime telenovela Duas Caras. It was her first villain character for the actress, her character was one of the major factors that boosted the audience of the Aguinaldo Silva's telenovela.

In 2009, she portrayed a prostitute in the film Os Normais 2 – A Noite Mais Maluca de Todas, which was the second film in the series originally starred by Luiz Fernando Guimarães and Fernanda Torres.

Moraes played the former model Luciana Ribeiro in Viver a Vida, a telenovela created and written by Manoel Carlos. Her character was a daughter of Marcos Ribeiro (José Mayer) and Tereza (Lília Cabral). Luciana is a rival of Helena Toledo (Taís Araújo), wife of her father. She suffers a road accident that leaves her tetraplegic thus bringing her career to a halt.

Moraes played Queen Cristina in the 2011 telenovela Cordel Encantado, and in the same year she played Lili in the telenovela O Astro. Moraes played Silvia in the film Heleno.

In 2016, she played Diana, Gui's ex-wife in Rock Story.

Personal life
Between 2002 and 2005 she had a relationship with actor Cauã Reymond. In 2010, she ended her one-year and a half relationship with the bartender and businessman Rodrigo Mendonça.

In 2010, Moraes received the title of citizen emeritus of Sorocaba, in recognition of her work in film, theater and television.

On 8 May 2014, Moraes and boyfriend Mauro Lima, a Brazilian filmmaker, welcomed their first son, Pedro.

Filmography

Television

Film

Stage

Awards and nominations

References

External links

 
 Mônica Paiva's Como Uma Onda article
 News article about Alinne Moraes voted as the sexiest woman in the world

1982 births
Living people
People from Sorocaba
Brazilian people of Italian descent
Brazilian people of Portuguese descent
Brazilian telenovela actresses
Brazilian film actresses
Brazilian female models
Brazilian stage actresses
Brazilian atheists
21st-century Brazilian actresses